Local elections were held in Kilifi County to elect a Governor and County Assembly on 4 March 2013. Under the new constitution, which was passed in a 2010 referendum, the 2013 general elections were the first in which Governors and members of the County Assemblies for the newly created counties were elected.

Gubernatorial election

Prospective candidates
The following are some of the candidates who have made public their intentions to run: 
 Prof Gabriel Katana - KADU–Asili
 Prof Mwachiro Chenje - The National Alliance
 John Lennga - Orange Democratic Movement 
 Prof Leno Mbaga - an independent aspirant.

References

 

2013 local elections in Kenya